Felipe Hernández (born June 8, 1998) is a professional soccer player who plays as a midfielder for Major League Soccer club Sporting Kansas City. Born in Colombia, he represented the United States national under-19 team.

Career
The Colombian-born Hernández was raised in Nashville, Tennessee, before joining Sporting Nashville Heroes, an academy affiliate. Hernández, formerly a US youth international, moved into SKC's residential academy in 2014. Hernández signed with Kansas City's USL affiliate Swope Park Rangers on March 10, 2016, developing into an MLS player. in 3 seasons with Swope Park Rangers Hernandez scored 13 goals and provided assists for a club-record 10 assists in 79 matches.

On August 30, 2019, Hernández moved to Swope Park's MLS parent club Sporting Kansas City.

On October 8, 2021, Hernández was suspended by the league for gambling on MLS games and would miss the remainder of the season. He returned to Sporting in 2022, playing in every regular season MLS match.

Career statistics

Honors
Swope Park Rangers
United Soccer League Cup: Runner-up 2017
U.S. Open Cup: 2017

References

1998 births
Living people
American soccer players
Sporting Kansas City II players
Sporting Kansas City players
Association football midfielders
USL Championship players
Major League Soccer players
United States men's youth international soccer players
People from Ibagué
Sportspeople from Nashville, Tennessee
Soccer players from Tennessee
Homegrown Players (MLS)
MLS Next Pro players